Elections to Central Bedfordshire Council were held on 2 May 2019, along with other local elections. The whole council was up for election, with each successful candidate serving a four-year term of office, expiring in 2023.

Summary

Election result

|-

Ward results

Ampthill

Arlesey

 
 
 
 

 

No UKIP (-20.7) or Independent (-16.4) candidates as previous.

Aspley and Woburn

 
 

 

No Green candidate as previous (-26.8).

Barton-le-Clay

Biggleswade North

 
 
 

 

No UKIP (-23.6) or Green (-11.0) candidates as previous.

Biggleswade South

 
 
 
 
 

 

No Independent (-12.1) or Green (-10.0) candidates as previous.

Caddington

 
 
 

 

No Independent (-22.4) or Green (-9.1) candidates as previous.

Cranfield and Marston Moretaine

Dunstable Central

 
 

 

No Independent candidate as previous (-16.7).

Dunstable Icknield

Dunstable Manshead

Dunstable Northfields

Dunstable Watling

Eaton Bray

Flitwick

Heath and Reach

Houghton Conquest and Haynes

Houghton Hall

Leighton Buzzard North

Leighton Buzzard South

Linslade

Northill

Parkside

Potton

Sandy

Shefford

Silsoe and Shillington

Stotfold and Langford

Tithe Farm

Toddington

Westoning, Flitton and Greenfield

References

2019 English local elections
May 2019 events in the United Kingdom
2019